Pseudotropheus interruptus is a species of cichlid in the Cichlidae endemic to Lake Malawi where it is only known from Likoma Island. This species can reach a length of  TL. It can also be found in the aquarium trade.

References

interruptus
Fish described in 1975
Taxonomy articles created by Polbot